, also known as the Danzan Shrine, the  and the , is a Shinto shrine in Sakurai, Nara Prefecture, Japan.

History

The shrine traces its origin to a Tendai temple built in the Asuka period (538 – 710) called Tōnomine-ji, built by the monk Jo'e (643 – 666). Jo'e was the oldest son of Fujiwara no Kamatari (614 – 669), founder of the Fujiwara clan. Jo'e located the temple on Tōnomine, a peak of on the southern side of Mount Goharetsu. Jo'e moved the remains of Kamatari to a 13-story pagoda on the site. During the Heian period, the temple developed together with the prosperity of the Fujiwara clan. The emperors Daigo (884 – 930) and Go-Hanazono (1419 – 1471) attached special reverence to the temple, and bestowed it with various honorifics.

Under shinbutsu-shūgō, a system of syncretism of Buddhism and kami worship, the site was both a Shinto shrine and a Buddhist temple. The Tanzan Shrine and Tōnomine-ji coexisted on the same site. The shrine received significant financial support from the Tokugawa bakufu during the Edo period (1603 – 1868).

During the anti-Buddhist shinbutsu bunri movement after the Meiji Restoration of 1868 Tanzan Shrine was designated solely as a Shinto shrine dedicated to the worship of the kami of Fujiwara no Kamatari. The Buddhist structures of the shrine were rededicated as Shinto structures. Under the Modern system of ranked Shinto Shrines, the Tanzan Shrine was designated a bekkaku kanreisha in 1874, an Imperial shrine of special status. The shrine lost this designation after the abolition of the ranked shrine system after World War II.
Beppyo shrines

Structures

The present thirteen-story wooden pagoda was built in 1532, and is a reconstruction of the structure built by Jo'e in the Asuka Period. The pagoda is designated an Important Cultural Properties of Japan. The honden, or main hall, is built in the Kasuga-zukuri style.  It is dedicated to Fujiwara no Kamatari.

Kemari Matsuri

A Kemari Matsuri, or kickball festival, is held every year on April 29 and the second Sunday in November. On this day, people in ancient costumes and arranged in a circle play a form of football in which they kick a ball made of deerskin to each other.

See also 
 For an explanation of terms concerning Japanese Buddhism, Japanese Buddhist art, and Japanese Buddhist temple architecture, see the Glossary of Japanese Buddhism.

References

Gallery

External links 

Official Site (Japanese)

7th-century Shinto shrines
Shinto shrines in Nara Prefecture
Buddhist temples in Nara Prefecture
Religious organizations established in the 7th century
Important Cultural Properties of Japan
Shinbutsu bunri
Religious buildings and structures completed in 678